R42 or R-42 may refer to:

Roads 
 R42 (Belgium)
 R42 (South Africa)

Other uses 
 R42 (New York City Subway car)
 , a destroyer of the Royal Navy
 Junkers R 42, a transport aircraft
 R42: May cause sensitisation by inhalation, a risk phrase
 Sidolówka, a Polish hand grenade
 Spectre R42, a British sports car